Sasikrishnan is an Indian artist, sculptor and art director of short movies.

Biography

Sasikrishnan is the founder of the Philaesthoism Movement Of Art that incorporates into art, the subtle elements of love and beauty found in human relations. Born on 4 August 1966 in Vatakara, Kerala, his parents Krishnan and Kalyani were social workers. He is married to mathematician Beena Sasikrishnan and the couple have two sons, Anandu Sasikrishnan and Aditya Sasikrishnan.

From 1987 Sasi has held many exhibitions in different parts of India.  He is the recipient of numerous awards from Governmental as well as private bodies.

Philaesthoism

Philaesthoism is an artistic practice that lays stress on infusing art with the beauty and love found in human bonds. It was coined by internationally acclaimed Indian artist, Sasi Krishnan in the early 2000s. As a spokesperson of this practice, Sasi Krishnan has created a number of pieces of art that incorporate this ideology. The Philaesthoism Movement of Art is a movement born out of this ideology, and aims at nurturing love and peace in man's world through art forms that showcase this thought in their composition, palette, theme and other aspects. This movement may be regarded as a plausible solution for the most harrowing predicament that this universe faces today - Lack of Peace. Like Music, Art is a universal language of love that travels beyond socio-political, economic and cultural barriers. The Artist firmly believes that through art that highlights the beauty of love and human bonds, we can usher in a world of peace.

Art exhibitions

 1987       Madappally Govt College, Kerala
 1991       Ooty, The Nilgris, Tamil Nadu
 1991       Kotagiri, The Nilgris, Tamil Nadu
 1992       Coonoor, The Nilgris, Tamil Nadu
 1997       Victoria, Gallery, Madras, Tamil Nadu
 1998       Chitram Art Gallery, Cochin, Kerala
 2000       St. Thomas College, Trissur, Kerala
 2001       Blossom Intel Park, Munnar, Kerala 
 2002       Camlin Ltd, Bangalore, Karnataka
 2005       Lalit Kala Academy, Chennai
 2006       Sri Parvati Art Gallery, Chennai
 2012       Lalit Kala Academy, Chennai
 2012       ANOKHII National Exhibition, Trivandrum
 2012       ANOKHII International Exhibition, Pune
 2012       Kuwait, Pravasi Auditorium
 2013       Exhibition at UIS, Kuwait 
 2014       International Exhibition Luminsense at Lalitha Kala Academy, Trichur, Kerala
 2014       International Exhibition Museum of Modern Art (MOMA) Kuwait "Colours of East and West"
 2015       IARTCO International Exhibition, Ahmedabad
 2016       Mind, Space and Beauty - Lalitha Kala Academy, Durbar Hall, Cochin, Kerala
 2016       Philaesthoism - Chithra Kala Parishath, Bangalore, Karnataka
 2017       Marghazi Festival Exhibition, Chennai 
 2017       Incredible India Exhibition, Lulu Center, Kuwait 
 2017       Kuwait Art Association (organized by National Bank of Kuwait), Kuwait
2018       Solo exhibition at Art Soul Life Gallery, Noida
2018       World Environment Day Exhibition, Kuwait

Reviews
 Jul 2016 - The Hindu Metroplus Cochin 
 Jul 2016 - Governance Today, National Magazine 
 Jul 2016 - Love on Canvas 
 Dec 2015ec 2015 - Aesthetica UK Magazine Interview 
 Day 2015 - Pool Magazine, Bombay  
 Feb 2015 -  Arts Illustrated, Chennai  
 May 2014 - Times Kuwait interview. 
 April 2014 - Times of India. 
 March 2013 - Bazaar Magazine, Kuwait. 
 18 Jun 2012 - Arab Times, Kuwait. 
 2012 - Kuwait Times, Kuwait. 
 16 Sep 2008 - The Hindu, Metroplus
 Feb 2007 - The New Indian Express, Cochin
 17 Nov 2005 - Maalai Malar, Chennai
 Dec 2005 - Mathrubhumi
 26 Dec 2005 - New Today Chennai
 16 Nov 2005 - City Chennai
 13 Nov 2005 - Mathrubhumi
 13 Nov 2005 - Malayala Manorama
 16 November 2005 - The Hindu, Chennai. 
 Nov 2005 - Indian Express, Chennai
 Apr - Jun 2001 - Tata Tea Seithikal/Tatean House Magazine
 5 Mar 2000 - The Week, Blending music and art
 Aug 1997, Composer of music on canvas

References

External links
 

Living people
1966 births
Indian male sculptors